Patrick Gorman may refer to:

 Patrick Gorman (politician) (born 1984), Australian politician
 Patrick Gorman (American actor) (born 1934), American actor
 Patrick E. Gorman (1892–1980), American trade unionist
 Pat Gorman (1931–2019), British actor
 Eugene Gorman (1891–1973), known as Pat, Australian barrister and military officer

See also 
 MacGorman, also Gorman, an Irish clan